Hiroyasu Shoji (東海林 弘靖, born in 1958) is a Japanese lighting designer.

Hiroyasu Shoji is the president of LIGHTDESIGN INC, located in Ginza, Tokyo. He began serving as the director of the Japanese International Lighting Designers Association when it was founded.

Career 
Hiroyasu Shoji founded the lighting design studio “LIGHTDESIGN INC.” in 2000. He has worked with architects including Zaha Hadid, Fumihiko Maki, Toyo Ito, Sou Fujimoto. He has focused on lighting design since 2011.

Inspiration 
He was inspired to focus his work on lighting due to the blackout following the Fukushima earthquake in 2011 and by a visit to Papua New Guinea which had no electricity at the time.

Projects and Awards

References

External links
 

1958 births
Living people
Japanese designers